Fitriani (born 27 December 1998) is an Indonesian badminton player specializing in women's singles and women's doubles discipline affiliated with Exist club. She won team silver at the 2019 Southeast Asian Games and bronze medals at the 2017 Southeast Asian Games and 2018 Asian Games.

Awards and nominations

Achievements

Islamic Solidarity Games 
Women's singles

BWF World Tour (1 title) 
The BWF World Tour, which was announced on 19 March 2017 and implemented in 2018, is a series of elite badminton tournaments sanctioned by the Badminton World Federation (BWF). The BWF World Tour is divided into levels of World Tour Finals, Super 1000, Super 750, Super 500, Super 300 (part of the HSBC World Tour), and the BWF Tour Super 100.

Women's singles

BWF Grand Prix (1 runner-up) 
The BWF Grand Prix had two levels, the Grand Prix and Grand Prix Gold. It was a series of badminton tournaments sanctioned by the Badminton World Federation (BWF) and played between 2007 and 2017.

Women's singles

 BWF Grand Prix Gold tournament
 BWF Grand Prix tournament

BWF International Challenge/Series (2 titles, 1 runner-up) 
Women's singles

 BWF International Challenge tournament
 BWF International Series tournament

BWF Junior International (2 titles) 
Girls' singles

  BWF Junior International Grand Prix tournament
  BWF Junior International Challenge tournament
  BWF Junior International Series tournament
  BWF Junior Future Series tournament

Performance timeline

National team 
 Junior level

 Senior level

Individual competitions

Junior level 
 Girls' singles

Senior level

Women's singles

Women's doubles 
 Senior level

Career overview

Record against selected opponents 
Head to head (H2H) against World Superseries finalists, World Championships semifinalists, and Olympic quarterfinalists:

 Women's singles 

 Women's doubles, with Yulia Yosephine Susanto

References 

1998 births
Living people
People from Garut
Sportspeople from West Java
Indonesian female badminton players
Badminton players at the 2018 Asian Games
Asian Games bronze medalists for Indonesia
Asian Games medalists in badminton
Medalists at the 2018 Asian Games
Competitors at the 2017 Southeast Asian Games
Competitors at the 2019 Southeast Asian Games
Southeast Asian Games silver medalists for Indonesia
Southeast Asian Games bronze medalists for Indonesia
Southeast Asian Games medalists in badminton
Islamic Solidarity Games competitors for Indonesia